La famiglia Benvenuti (literally "The Benvenuti Family") is an Italian comedy television series that originally ran on RAI from 1968 to 1970. Two seasons were produced: the first shot in black and white, the second, experimentally, was instead made in color, although the RAI had not yet adopted this technique (the color broadcasts officially started only eight years later).

Cast 
Enrico Maria Salerno
Valeria Valeri
Valerio Fioravanti
Massimo Farinelli
Claudio Gora
Milly
Marina Coffa
Leopoldo Trieste
Giulio Platone

See also
List of Italian television series

External links
 
La famiglia Benvenuti (first season) on Rai Play.

Italian television series

1968 Italian television series debuts
RAI original programming